David Steel is a British politician.

David Steel may also refer to:
David Steel (minister) (1910–2002), father of the politician
Dave Steel, musician with Weddings Parties Anything and solo
David Steel (Royal Navy officer) (born 1961), British admiral
David Steel (businessman) (1916–2004), British businessman, chairman of BP, and of the Wellcome Trust
David Steel , American voice actor

See also
David Steele (disambiguation)